This page lists all described species of the spider family Atracidae accepted by the World Spider Catalog :

Atrax

Atrax O. Pickard-Cambridge, 1877
 A. robustus O. Pickard-Cambridge, 1877 (type) — Australia (New South Wales)
 A. sutherlandi Gray, 2010 — Australia (New South Wales, Victoria)
 A. yorkmainorum Gray, 2010 — Australia (New South Wales, Australian Capital Territory)

Hadronyche

Hadronyche L. Koch, 1873
 H. adelaidensis (Gray, 1984) — Australia (South Australia)
 H. alpina Gray, 2010 — Australia (New South Wales, Australian Capital Territory)
 H. annachristiae Gray, 2010 — Australia (New South Wales)
 H. anzses Raven, 2000 — Australia (Queensland)
 H. cerberea L. Koch, 1873 (type) — Australia (New South Wales)
 H. emmalizae Gray, 2010 — Australia (New South Wales)
 H. eyrei (Gray, 1984) — Australia (South Australia)
 H. flindersi (Gray, 1984) — Australia (South Australia)
 H. formidabilis (Rainbow, 1914) — Australia (Queensland, New South Wales)
 H. infensa (Hickman, 1964) — Australia (Queensland, New South Wales)
 H. jensenae Gray, 2010 — Australia (Victoria)
 H. kaputarensis Gray, 2010 — Australia (New South Wales)
 H. lamingtonensis Gray, 2010 — Australia (Queensland)
 H. levittgreggae Gray, 2010 — Australia (New South Wales)
 H. lynabrae Gray, 2010 — Australia (New South Wales)
 H. macquariensis Gray, 2010 — Australia (New South Wales)
 H. marracoonda Gray, 2010 — Australia (New South Wales, Australian Capital Territory)
 H. mascordi Gray, 2010 — Australia (New South Wales)
 H. meridiana Hogg, 1902 — Australia (New South Wales, Victoria)
 H. modesta (Simon, 1891) — Australia (Victoria)
 H. monaro Gray, 2010 — Australia (New South Wales)
 H. monteithi Gray, 2010 — Australia (Queensland)
 H. nimoola Gray, 2010 — Australia (New South Wales, Australian Capital Territory)
 H. orana Gray, 2010 — Australia (New South Wales)
 H. pulvinator (Hickman, 1927) — Australia (Tasmania)
 H. raveni Gray, 2010 — Australia (Queensland)
 H. tambo Gray, 2010 — Australia (Victoria)
 H. valida (Rainbow & Pulleine, 1918) — Australia (Queensland, New South Wales)
 H. venenata (Hickman, 1927) — Australia (Tasmania)
 H. versuta (Rainbow, 1914) — Australia (New South Wales)
 H. walkeri Gray, 2010 — Australia (New South Wales)

Illawarra

Illawarra Gray, 2010
 I. wisharti Gray, 2010 (type) — Australia (New South Wales)

References

Atracidae